W32.Myzor.yf is a fictional computer virus hyped by advertising software related to the Zlob trojan. When a computer is controlled by the advertising software, the browser will be redirected to secureiepage.com, displaying a pop-up ad about the supposed virus. The pop-up ad lists many harmful effects, despite only redirecting the browser and adding two flashing icons to the system tray. By listing harmful effects, it attempts to convince the user to purchase software by stating "YOUR COMPUTER WAS INFECTED WITH MALWARE!".

The popups states that Myzor infects ANY (Or all) .exe files and steals ALL computer passwords.

References

Virus hoaxes